The Khayyam gas field is an Iranian natural gas field that was discovered in 2011. It began production in 2011 and produces natural gas and condensates. The total proven reserves of the Khayyam gas field are around 9.8 trillion cubic feet (278×109m3) and production is slated to be around 840 million cubic feet/day (24×106m3).

References

Natural gas fields in Iran